The Programa Pueblos Pintorescos ("Picturesque Towns Program") is an initiative led by Guatemala's Instituto Guatemalteco de Turismo, known as INGUAT. The program seeks to promote sustainable tourism development in a network of towns and cities that have been identified for their historical, cultural, and natural attributes.

Upon the program's establishment in August of 2019, a total of 9 cities and towns were identified by INGUAT as having the "relevant characteristics and initiatives" to be designated as Pueblos Pintorescos. This initial cohort of 9 communities is distributed among 7 of Guatemala's 22 departments.

Inaugural Cohort of Pueblos Pintorescos

See also 

 Pueblos Mágicos (Mexico)
 Pueblos Mágicos (Ecuador)
 Pueblo Patrimonio (Colombia)

References

External links 

 https://inguat.gob.gt/gestion-turistica/programas/programa-pueblos-pintorescos

 
Guatemala